Jackass Presents: Mat Hoffman's Tribute to Evel Knievel is a 2008 direct-to-DVD comedy film and the first Jackass Presents film in the Jackass franchise. It was released on May 27, 2008. The film is a tribute to the stuntman Evel Knievel, who died on November 30, 2007, one year before the film's release. Jackass Presents: Mat Hoffman's Tribute to Evel Knievel was succeeded by Jackass Presents: Bad Grandpa.

References

External links

 
 

2008 comedy films
2008 films
2008 direct-to-video films
Films based on television series
MTV Films films
Jackass (film series)
Jackass (TV series)
American comedy films
Dickhouse Productions films
2000s English-language films
2000s American films